is a 1960 Japanese yakuza film directed by Yasuzo Masumura and starring Yukio Mishima.

Cast
 Yukio Mishima – Takeo Asahina
 Ayako Wakao – Yoshie Koizumi
 Keizo Kawasaki – Shoichi Koizumi
 Eiji Funakoshi – Susumu Aikawa
 Takashi Shimura – Gohei Hirayama
 Yaeko Mizutani – Masako Katori
 Michiko Ono – Ayako Takatsu

Theme song
"Karakkaze Yarō" (released by King Records on March 20, 1960, in Japan)

Lyrics and vocals: Yukio Mishima
Music and guitar: Shichirō Fukazawa
Arrangement: Koji Eguchi

The soundtrack is now on CD.

References

External links

Japanese movie database からっ風野郎

1960 films
Japanese crime drama films
1960 crime drama films
Films directed by Yasuzo Masumura
Daiei Film films
Yakuza films
1960s Japanese-language films
1960s Japanese films